The Romblon Provincial Federation of Sangguniang Kabataan (PFSK) is the official association of elected Sangguniang Kabataan presidents in the province of Romblon. It is composed of eighteen (18) members; seventeen (17) Municipal Sangguniang Kabataan Federation President and one (1) Provincial SK Federation President. It is their thrust to conduct and implement programs that would improve the youth of Romblon socially, intellectually, spiritually, politically, and morally to be dynamic, productive, and effective citizens and future leaders of the province of Romblon and the republic as a whole.

Officers and Members
All Municipal SK Federation Presidents of the seventeen (17) municipalities of Romblon gathered together on December 17, 2007 at the Department of the Interior and Local Government Provincial Office at Odiongan, Romblon to elect their Local Executive Council.  The then Municipal SK Federation President of the municipality of San Jose, Hon. VJ Maulion, ran and won unopposed as Provincial SK Federation President and became the ex-officio member of the Sangguniang Panlalawigan of Romblon.  Pursuant to the SK Constitution and By-laws,

Hon. VJ Maulion
Odiongan, Romblon
President

Hon. Ma. Cecilia Emiliano
Looc, Romblon
Vice President

Hon. Ihron F. Soriano
Looc, Romblon
Secretary

Projects, Programs and Activities

2008 Sangguniang Kabataan Lakbay Aral
On June 4–8, 2008, the Romblon Provincial SK Federation visited the Provinces of Batangas and Cavite.  The Romblon Provincial SK Fed had a courtesy call with Hon. Juan Miguel Ilano, the Provincial SK President of Cavite, and had the chance to meet their counterparts and to observe SK projects of the province that are applicable to Romblon.  This 2008 Lakbay Aral gave new ideas to Romblon's SK Leaders in terms of Youth Development and Empowerment.

2008 Linggo ng Kabataan (LNK)
Article 209 of the SK Constitution and By- Laws mandated that the Pederasyon ng Sangguniang Kabataan shall conduct the celebration of the Linggo ng Kabataan.
On December 15–21, 2008, the Romblon PFSK's celebration of the 2008 Linggo ng Kabataan was to date the first ever celebration of the linggo ng kabataan in the SK history of the province of Romblon.  The celebration was participated by the Municipal SK Federation Presidents and their respective Vice Presidents.  SK leaders of the province assumed as Provincial Officials, elected and appointed, for one week.

2008 LNK Designations

Romblon Youth Development Council
On 7 July 2009, the Provincial Board of Romblon passed an “Ordinance Creating the Romblon Youth Development Council”.  The ordinance covers the youth ranging from 15 to 30 years old and was based from Republic Act 8044.

Under the provincial ordinance the council is tasked to “formulate policies and component programs in coordination with the various government agencies having youth related programs, projects and activities”

Last summer, the Committee on Youth and Sports Development chaired by Board Member Mark Philip Tandog with members Board Member Fred Dorado, Board Member Dong-Dong Ylagan, conducted a hearing and dialogue with the Municipal SK presidents from different municipalities held at Municipality of San Jose in connection with the ordinance on Romblon Youth Development Council, the inputs and observations of youth participants from the meeting were also integrated in the final draft of the ordinance.
After some amendment, and further consultations with various youth groups by authors BM Dong-Dong Ylagan and BM Mark Philip Tandog the ordinance was finally approved on final reading last 21 July 2009.

At present the provincial government of Romblon is already actively supporting programs for the youth many of which are from its sports development program.  Under the leadership of the young Governor Jojo Beltran many youth activities have already been sponsored and supported by the provincial government.

With the passage of the provincial ordinance it is believed that a more comprehensive and integrated approach to all youth programs and activities will be included in the annual development program of the province.

Provincial Sangguniang Kabataan Congress

2009 Provincial SK Congress
Theme: "SK 101: LEAD (Leadership, Excellence, Awareness, Dynamism)"
Date: 19–22 May 2009
Venue: Romblon State College, Odiongan, Romblon

As part of the Romblon Provincial SK Fed's service and commitment, and pursuant to the 2001 Katipunan ng Kabataan and Sangguniang Kabataan Constitution and By-laws under Article XII: Meetings and Quorum, Section 7 stating that: "An SK Provincial Congress shall be called every year for the purpose of a comprehensive consultation of the SK issues and concerns.  For this purpose the Congress shall be composed of all constituent Panlungsod and Pambayang Pederasyon presidents and the constituent SK chairmen.", the Romblon PFSK, in cooperation with the National Youth Commission (NYC), the Philippine Drug Enforcement Agency - Mimaropa, the Provincial Government of Romblon, and the Department of the Interior and Local Government (DILG) - Romblon, conducted the 2009 Provincial SK Congress on 19–22 May 2009 at the Romblon State College - Main Campus, Odiongan, Romblon.

2010 Provincial SK Congress
Theme: "Sulong Kabataan! Lakas ng Pwersa, Ipakita."
Date: 6–9 April 2010
Venue: Great Eastern Hotel, Quezon City.

2009 Romblon PFSK Mangrove Planting Activity
As support to the National SK Federation's green program which was launched last 1 April 2009, with the theme "Sama-sama para sa Kalikasan", and as conclusion to the 2009 Provincial SK Congress, the Romblon Provincial Federation, in cooperation with Odiongan's Municipal Environment and Natural Resources Officer and barangay Canduyong officials, launched its first provincial environmental program, the 2009 Romblon PFSK Mangrove Planting Activity on 22 May 2009 at Barangay Canduyong, Odiongan, Romblon.

The mangrove planting activity was participated by more or less seven hundred (700) SK officials from around the province and was to date the largest mangrove planting activity spearheaded by the youth in the history of the province of Romblon.

Ten Accomplished and Active Sangguniang Kabataan (TAAS Kabataan) Awards
With the objective of recognizing the efforts of the SK youth leaders in the province, the Romblon Provincial SK Fed will launch the Ten Accomplished and Active Sangguniang Kabataan (TAAS Kabataan) Awards. Sangguniang Kabataan of each barangay are entitled to join by submitting their accomplishment report from November 2007 up to March 2010. The respective barangays of the Provincial SK Federation President and the 17 Municipal SK Federation Presidents are not allowed to join. The Ten Accomplished and Active Sangguniang Kabataan (TAAS Kabataan) awardees shall be recognized and awarded on 7 April 2010 in line with the celebration of the 2010 Provincial SK Congress.

See also
Romblon
Sangguniang Kabataan

References

External links
National Youth Commission - Philippines
Province of Romblon Official Website
Romblon Travel Guide
Friendster Romblon PFSK 2007-present

Youth councils
Katipunan ng Kabataan
Politics of Romblon